Conte Verde was the third of three s built for the Italian Regia Marina (Royal Navy), though she differed in several respects from her sisters. Unlike the other two members of her class, she did not receive complete iron armor, instead relying on partial plating at her bow and stern. She was laid down in February 1863, she was launched in July 1867, and she was completed in December 1871. Conte Verde was a broadside ironclad armed with a battery of four  guns and eighteen  guns. Her career was limited, owing to the emergence of more modern ironclads and a severe reduction in the Italian naval budget following their defeat at the Battle of Lissa in 1866. She was discarded in 1880 and sold to ship breakers to help pay for new ironclads then under construction.

Design

She had a crew of 572. Her propulsion system consisted of one single-expansion marine steam engine that drove a single screw propeller, with steam supplied by six coal-fired, cylindrical fire-tube boilers. To supplement her steam engine, the ship was barque-rigged.

Conte Verde was a broadside ironclad, and she was armed with a main battery of four 72-pounder  guns and eighteen  rifled muzzle-loading guns. The ship was equipped with a spur-shaped ram at the bow. Unlike her two sisters, Conte Verde did not have complete iron armor on her sides. She instead had wrought iron armor that covered only parts of her bow and stern. The rest of the ship received traditional timber armor.

Service history
The keel for Conte Verde was laid down at the San Rocco shipyard in Livorno on 2 February 1863. She was launched on 29 July 1867, and was completed in December 1871. The ship did not have a long or particularly active career; rapidly surpassed first by central battery and then turret ships, the first generation of ironclads with traditional broadside quickly became obsolete. In addition, the Italian government lost confidence in the fleet after its defeat in 1866 at the Battle of Lissa and drastically reduced the naval budget. The cuts were so severe that the fleet had great difficulty in mobilizing its ironclad squadron to attack the port of Civitavecchia in September 1870, as part of the wars of Italian unification. Instead, the ships were laid up and the sailors conscripted to man them were sent home.

As a result, Conte Verde saw little use in her nine years in service. Together with the ships of the 2nd Division, the entire squadron cruised in the Mediterranean that year. In February, Conte Verde steamed Portugal to visit the capital, Lisbon. She departed on 4 March and returned to Italy, stopping in Gaeta before arriving in Naples. The ship was stricken from the naval register in 1880, but was not actually broken up for scrap until 1898. The Navy discarded both of her sisters, along with the ironclad  between 1875 and 1880 to remove the cost of maintaining them from the naval budget, as part of an effort to reduce the financial impact of the new  and es then under construction.

Notes

References

External links
 Conte Verde Marina Militare website 

1867 ships
Conte Verde
Ships built in Livorno